Sardar Muhammad Muqeem Khan  Khoso (October 12, 1949 – April 17, 2016) was a Pakistani politician who served as member of the National Assembly of Pakistan. He died at the age of 66.

References

1949 births
2016 deaths
Baloch people
Pakistani MNAs 1988–1990
Pakistan People's Party politicians
People from Jacobabad District